Amberoid (foaled 1963 in Kentucky) was an American Thoroughbred racehorse best known for winning the 1966 American Classic, the Belmont Stakes.

Amberoid was conditioned for racing by future Hall of Fame trainer Lucien Laurin and ridden primarily by another future Hall of Fame inductee, Bill Boland. Going into the 1966 U.S. Triple Crown series, Amberoid won the Wood Memorial Stakes. He then finished seventh in the Kentucky Derby and third in the Preakness Stakes before winning the final leg of the Triple Crown, the Belmont Stakes.

When his racing career was over, Amberoid stood at stud in the United States from 1969 to 1973, after which he stood in Japan until he died on June 30, 1985.

References

 Amberoid's pedigree and partial racing stats
 June 13, 1966 Sports Illustrated article on Amberoid's win in the Belmont Stakes
 Amberoid's profile at Classic Runners

1963 racehorse births
1985 racehorse deaths
Racehorses bred in Kentucky
Racehorses trained in the United States
Thoroughbred family 8-c
Byerley Turk sire line